Maja Solar (Serbian-Cyrillic: Маја Солар; born 6 February 1980 in Zagreb, Yugoslavia) is a Serbian poetress and Marxist-feminist philosopher.

Biography
Maja Solar studied philosophy at the Faculty of Philosophy of the University of Novi Sad, graduated with Magister thesis on Darwin and Essentialism in 2008 and obtained her doctorate as PhD with thesis on The problem of ownership in Rousseau’s and Marx's philosophy in 2014. She was assistant at the department of philosophy of the university, specialized in philosophy of economics with focus on Marxism, political philosophy, philosophy of science and feminist theory from 2009–14.

Some Serbian scientific, literary and feminist journals already published many of her essays and reviews in recent years. The scholar participates in Gerusija collective for several years, she was member of the editorial-board of the literary journal Polja from 2007–14, she is translator of texts by Lyn Hejinian, Kristin Ross, Bhaskar Sunkara, Perry Anderson, Gideon Levy, Alain Badiou, Pierre Bourdieu, Paul Nizan, Jacques Rancière, Lionel Richard, Ignacio Ramonet, Rafael Correa, Chantal Mouffe, Serge Halimi and many others into Serbian, and she has been working as translator for the Serbian edition of Le Monde diplomatique since 2015. In addition to her academic work, Maja Solar is considered to be one of the most important poets of the female generation of contemporary Serbian poetry. An edition of collected poems has already been published in Hungarian (2015), selected poems in German (2011), Polish (2015) and English (2016) anthologies, and three poems in Dutch translation (2018) of the online literature magazine Samplekanon.

Since 2019, together with Željko Jacques Lučić, she has been creating and editing the poetry podcast Puna Usta Poezije.

Awards
She received the Branko Award (Brankova nagrada) in 2009.

Bibliography (selection)
Makulalalalatura (Maculalalalature; word play with maculature), poetry, Studentski kulturni centar, Kragujevac 2008, .
Jellemző, hogy nem természetes : versek (It's characteristic that it is not natural: poems), Forum, Újvidék 2015, .
Bez začina (Without Spices), poetry, Kulturni centar Novog Sada, Novi Sad 2017, .
Eintrittskarte Serbien: Panorama der Lyrik des 21. Jahrhunderts (Entrance Ticket Serbia: Panorama of the Poetry of the 21st Century), Drava, Klagenfurt 2011, .
Serce i krew : antologia nowej liryki serbskiej (Heart and Blood: Anthology of New Serbian Poetry), Wschodnia Fundacja Kultury "Akcent", Lublin 2015,.
Cat Painters: An Anthology of Contemporary Serbian Poetry, Lavender Ink, New Orleans 2016, .

References

1980 births
Living people
Academic staff of the University of Novi Sad
Serbian women scientists
Serbian women philosophers
Serbian women poets
Womanist writers
Socialist feminists
Marxist feminists
Writers from Novi Sad
University of Novi Sad alumni
Translators to Serbian
Translators from English
Translators from French